The Harmony Chinese Music Group (和聲中樂團) is a Chinese music group founded in 2001 in Bandung, Indonesia. The group seeks to promote a wide variety of world music based on Indonesian culture (keroncong, sundanese, batak) using Chinese musical instruments, as well as exploring contemporary styles.

In addition to regular concerts, the group presents workshops and other out-reach activities to a wide range of groups within the Indonesian cultural community. Since its founding, the group has performed throughout Indonesia to promote cultural blend. In Indonesia the group has been featured at the Solo International Keroncong Festival, the Kuta Karnival, Pesta Keroncong Johor 2011 and the Afro-Asian Conference 50th Anniversary.

Performances 

 Charity Concert @ CiWalk 2005 "Harmony in Humanity" for Aceh tsunami
 Collaboration Concert with Keroncong Merah Putih 2003
 Chinese Sundanese Concert with Nano Suratno 2004
 Afro Asia Art & Culture Festival 2005
 Indonesian Chinese Music Orchestra Concert 2006
 Commemorating 50 years Cultural Cooperation Indonesia - China 2007
 International Keroncong Festival 2008 Solo 
 Simple Gift Concert with Lippo Village Community Choir & Orchestra 2009
 Indonesian Culture in Harmony Music Concert 2010 with Ega R-Bot Percussion & OPM Solo
 Pesta Keroncong Johor 2011 in Johor Bahru

-

Members

Discography

Studio albums (original works) 
 Suara Hati - Chinese Moslem Album

Single 
 Pokoké Mak Nyus

Compilation 
 Surround in Harmony (In 5.1 surround sound)

Most of these CDs were released in Indonesia

Video
Youtube video

External links
Facebook Fan Page

See also
Traditional Chinese musical instruments
Music of China
Indonesian Music

References 

Indonesian musical groups
Chinese musical groups
Chinese musical instrument ensembles
World music groups
Musical groups established in 2001